Mohd. Raimi bin Md. Nor (born 4 April 1986) is a Malaysian footballer who plays as a defender.

Club career

Penang
On 29 December 2017, Raimi signed a contract with Malaysia Premier League side Penang. He made his debut for Penang in a 3–1 defeat against UiTM FC on 1 February 2018.

Career statistics

Club

References

External links
 
 Selangor FA official profile

1986 births
Living people
Malaysian footballers
Selangor FA players
Penang F.C. players
Malaysia Super League players
People from Selangor
Malaysian people of Malay descent
Association football fullbacks
Melaka United F.C. players